Pan Anzi (born 1977 in Nanjing, Jiangsu) is a Chinese film director.

Filmography
Scheme with Me (2012)
The Palace (2013)
Crazy New Year's Eve (2015)
For a Few Bullets (2016)

References

External links

Film directors from Jiangsu
Living people
1977 births
Artists from Nanjing